Simon-Napoléon Parent (September 12, 1855 – September 7, 1920) was the 12th premier of Quebec from October 3, 1900 to March 21, 1905, as well as serving as President of the Quebec Bridge and Railway Company.

Background

Parent was born in Quebec City. He was a lawyer by profession and his son, Georges Parent, was an MP in the House of Commons of Canada and later a Senator who served as Speaker of the Senate of Canada.

Political career

Parent ran as a Liberal candidate in the district of Saint-Sauveur in the 1890 election and won.  He was re-elected in 1892 and 1897.

He resigned in 1897 when he was appointed to Félix-Gabriel Marchand’s Cabinet but was re-elected in the subsequent by-election, as well as in 1900 and 1904.  Marchand died in office on September 25, 1900, and Parent succeeded him.  He won the 1900 election and the 1904 election and resigned in 1905 when 44 Liberal MLAs, led by Lomer Gouin, Adélard Turgeon and William Alexander Weir, pressured him to resign.

Parent also served as mayor of Quebec City from 1894 to 1906.

Death
He died in Montreal in 1920.

See also
Politics of Quebec
List of Quebec general elections
Timeline of Quebec history

References

1855 births
1920 deaths
Premiers of Quebec
Mayors of Quebec City
Quebec Liberal Party MNAs
Quebec political party leaders
Université Laval alumni